Mawsonites is a fossil genus dating to the Ediacaran Period from 635 – 539 million years ago during the Precambrian era. The fossils consist of a rounded diamond shape, made up from lobes radiating out from a central circle roughly 12 cm in diameter. There are about 19 radiations from the central circle.

The type species is Mawsonites spriggi, named after Douglas Mawson, and Reg Sprigg.  
It was named by  Martin Glaessner and Mary Wade in 1966.

Its biological affinities were called into question amidst suggestions that it might represent a mud volcano or other sedimentary structure, but further research showed that these structures could not satisfactorily account for its complexity.

The fossil has been theorized to represent algae holdfasts, jellyfish (although this is considered unlikely), a filter feeder, a burrow, a microbial colony or invertebrate tracks. Several of these possibilities would indicate that Mawsonites represents a trace fossil, not an organism.

See also
 List of Ediacaran genera

References 

Digging Up Deep Time, Paul Willis and Abbie Thomas
Ediacaran Taxa

Ediacaran life
Incertae sedis
Fossils of Russia
Fossil taxa described in 1966